James "Mick" Caba (born  February 16, 1950) is a retired American football coach. He served most recently as the head coach at Alfred State College in Alfred, New York, guiding that program from junior college status from 2000 to 2011 up to NCAA Division III competition from 2012 to 2014. He was inducted into the NJCAA Football Hall of Fame in 2012. Caba previously served as a head coach at several other schools, including Iowa Wesleyan College, Oklahoma Panhandle State University, the University of Minnesota–Morris, and William Penn University.

Head coaching record

College

References

1950 births
Living people
Alfred State Pioneers football coaches
Iowa Wesleyan Tigers athletic directors
Iowa Wesleyan Tigers football coaches
Minnesota Morris Cougars football coaches
Oklahoma Panhandle State Aggies football coaches
William Penn Statesmen football coaches
High school football coaches in Kentucky
High school football coaches in Michigan
Junior college football coaches in the United States
Georgetown College (Kentucky) alumni
People from Trenton, Michigan